William Knill (28 January 1859 – 8 July 1940) was an Australian cricketer. He played in six first-class matches for South Australia between 1880 and 1888.

See also
 List of South Australian representative cricketers

References

External links
 

1859 births
1940 deaths
Australian cricketers
South Australia cricketers
Cricketers from Adelaide